Marcillac is a commune in the Gironde department in southwestern France.

Marcillac may also refer to:

 Marcillac AOC, an Appellation d'Origine Contrôlée for wine from the Aveyron department
 Marcillac-Vallon, a commune in the Aveyron department in southern France
 Marcillac-Lanville, a commune in the Charente department in southwestern France
 Marcillac-la-Croisille, a commune in the Corrèze department in central France
 Marcillac-la-Croze, a commune in the Corrèze department in central France
 Marcillac-Saint-Quentin, a commune in the Dordogne department in southwestern France